Filip Borys Kubski (born June 15, 1987), better known as NEO, is a Polish player of the Counter-Strike series who is currently playing for Honoris. NEO is considered to be one of the best players in Counter-Strike history. He was also one of the "Golden Five" group of Polish CS players. Most recently he was the in-game leader for FaZe Clan.  He has played for Virtus.pro, AGAiN, Universal Soldiers, ESC Gaming, Frag eXecutors, Vitriolic, Wicked eSports, Meet Your Makers, and Pentagram G-Shock. Kubski has been playing professionally since 2004.

NEO is considered to be a mechanically gifted player, with an intelligent mind for the game. Kubski is also considered to be very good at Counter-Strike 1.6s in-game movement, which makes him difficult to counter. In 2010, HLTV users voted Kubski the greatest Counter-Strike player of the decade. He also won the eSports Award for eSports Player of the Year in 2007 and 2008, and was rated by HLTV.org as the best player of 2011.

 Counter-Strike 1.6 Career 
NEO first started playing Counter-Strike at the age of 12. With this lineup, they won 4 majors, World Cyber Games 2006, ESWC 2007, ESWC 2008, and WCG 2009. Even though there were no Valve organised tournaments in 1.6, generally, ESWC, CPL, WCG, and IEM are considered to be a CS 1.6 major. The previous Golden Five lineup is considered one of the best of all time in 1.6, and NEO was by far their best player. Following this change, the lineup would hit a slump. The team ended up winning the last 2 majors in CS 1.6 with ESC Gaming. NEO would be called by many the greatest CS 1.6 player ever. He was also given the #1 spot on the HLTV top 20 ranking in 2011.

 Counter-Strike: Global Offensive Career 
2012–2018
NEO continued playing with ESC Gaming, in Global Offensive.  He found little success at first, winning only 2 StarLadder events.  Loord and kuben were replaced by Janusz "Snax" Pogorzelski and Paweł "byali" Bieliński.  Loord reacted negatively to this, but said NEO was the only one he didn't hold a grudge against.  It wasn't until EMS One Katowice 2014 that NEO won a big tournament, this time with Virtus.pro.  At the end of 2015, NEO was awarded the #17 spot on HLTV's top 20 of 2015.  Despite this, NEO was no longer by far the best player on his team.  His individual skill had dropped off significantly from his performance in 1.6.  In May 2016, Virtus.pro won the first season of ELEAGUE, one of the biggest prize pools at the time.  In early 2017, Virtus.pro came second to Astralis at ELEAGUE Major 2017.  They followed this with a win at DreamHack Masters Las Vegas 2017.  Despite these results, VP eventually hit a massive slump.  They had a few decent results after this, including a semifinals finish at PGL Major Kraków, and a second place appearance at EPICENTER 2017.

2018–present
At the ELEAGUE Major 2018, Virtus.pro went out in last place, losing 3 games and winning none.  Following this, Virtus.pro ended the longest standing roster in CS:GO history by replacing Wiktor "TaZ" Wojtas with Michał "MICHU" Müller.  Him and NEO had been playing together for 12 years by this point.  Despite this, Virtus.pro would continue their slump, and NEO was replaced in February.  His individual form continued to drop off since 2017, but he was signed by FaZe Clan, replacing Dauren "AdreN" Kystaubayev.  FaZe needed an In-Game Leader, and NEO had previously been one of the IGLs for Virtus.pro.  With FaZe, NEO came second at BLAST Pro Series: Los Angeles, but at the major, he would once again exit in the group stage. His trial with FaZe Clan eventually came to an end, and his contract was not renewed. Currently, he is not officially a part of any notable teams.

 Notable Results Bold' denotes a CS:GO Major

Personal Awards
eSports Player of the Year: 2007, 2008
HLTV player of the decade
HLTV top 20: #7 of 2010, #1 of 2011, #15 of 2015

See also
 Wiktor "TaZ" Wojtas, fellow "Golden Five" teammate.

References

External links
 

1987 births
Polish esports players
Counter-Strike players
MeetYourMakers players
Virtus.pro players
Living people
People from Poznań